Université Catholique de l'Afrique de l'Ouest (UCAO) or Catholic University of West Africa was founded in 1967 as the Higher Institute of Religious Culture; later it became a university. It is situated in Abidjan, Ivory Coast. It has also campuses in Bobo-Dioulasso (Burkina Faso), Cotonou (Benin), Dakar(Senegal) and Lomé (Togo).

External links 

Université Catholique de l'Afrique de l'Ouest

Universities in Ivory Coast
Organizations based in Abidjan
Educational institutions established in 1967
Buildings and structures in Abidjan
1967 establishments in Ivory Coast